Iolanda Oanță (born 11 October 1965) is a Romanian track and field athlete who competed mainly in the 200 metres and 400 metres. She is a two-time silver medallist at the European Indoor Championships, and reached the quarterfinals of the 200 metres at the 1992 Barcelona Olympics.

International competitions

References

1965 births
Living people
Athletes (track and field) at the 1992 Summer Olympics
Romanian female sprinters
Olympic athletes of Romania
Place of birth missing (living people)
Olympic female sprinters